is a Japanese actress who appeared in the Super Sentai TV series Choujin Sentai Jetman. The program is the fifteenth entry of Toei Company's Super Sentai series. It aired on TV Asahi on February 15, 1991 to February 14, 1992 with a total of 51 episodes. She played the character "Ako Hayasaka" in the series.

Filmography

TV roles

 Dokincho! Nemurin (Fuji TV, 1984 - 1985) - Mako Ooishi 
 Papa Goukaku Mama wa Shikkaku (NTV, 1986) - Kaori Kurata
 Oyobi de nai Yatsu! (episode 9) (TBS, 1987)
 Momoiro Gakuen Toshi Sengen, Batsu Benten Jogakukan (Fuji TV, 1987)
 Kousoku Sentai Turboranger (episode 9) (TV Asahi, 1989) - Yumi Sakakibara
 Choujin Sentai Jetman (TV Asahi, 1991 - 1992) - Ako Hayasaka / Blue Swallow
 Sasurai Keiji Ryojou-Hen V (TV Asahi, 1992) - Harumi Tanaka
 Utau! Dai Ryuuguujou (episode 16) (Fuji TV, 1992) - Sayori
 Hyakujuu Sentai Gaoranger (episode 6) (TV Asahi, 2001) - Shimada

V-Cinema 
 B-Robo Kabutack: The Epic Christmas Battle!! (Toei Video, 1997)

Film 

 Miriko wa Makenai
 Super Sentai World (1994) - Voice Only in Blue Swallow

CM 

 Hagoromo Foods / Sea Chicken
 Yomiuri Land
 7-Eleven
 Kao / Kaori Haiter
 House Foods / Vermont Curry

References

External links 

  a b-Torijin Sentai Jetman HP-Performer information (fan site)
Hyakuju Sentai Gaoranger program official HP 

Actresses from Kanagawa Prefecture
Living people
Year of birth missing (living people)